The Baden X b of the Grand Duchy of Baden State Railway was a goods train tank locomotive with a 0-8-0T wheel arrangement.

In 1925 out of the 98 examples built, 90 entered the Deutsche Reichsbahn as DRG Class 92.2–3 in their numbering plan. Of these, 80 were taken over by the Deutsche Bundesbahn and two by the  Deutsche Reichsbahn (GDR).

See also
Grand Duchy of Baden State Railway
List of Baden locomotives and railbuses

References

10 b
0-8-0T locomotives
Standard gauge locomotives of Germany
Maffei locomotives
Railway locomotives introduced in 1907
D n2t locomotives
Maschinenbau-Gesellschaft Karlsruhe locomotives
Freight locomotives